Beaumont is an unincorporated community in Butler County, Kansas, United States.  As of the 2020 census, the population of the community and nearby areas was 36.

History

The surrounding area is farm land, settled by ranchers and farmers after the Civil War. Homesteaders from Missouri, Iowa, Tennessee, and other eastern states came because of an abundance of cheap land.

The town site was first a stop on the stagecoach route between Fredonia and Wichita. In 1879 Edwin and Emma Russell built the Summit Hotel, later renamed as the Beaumont Hotel. In 1885 the St. Louis and San Francisco Railroad, better known as the Frisco, established Beaumont as a railroad town. One line of tracks ran east and west, connecting St. Louis with Wichita. A spur was added later going south from Beaumont though Latham and on to the Oklahoma border. A roundhouse was built in 1890 across from the Summit Hotel, and employed 90 people. The water tower, built in 1885, stands across from the hotel and is on the National Register of Historic Places. Because of the rich bluestem grass, the area was used as staging area to ship cattle back east.

The railroad supported several businesses in Beaumont. These included a hardware store and lumber yard, as well as a pharmacy owned by the town's only physician and surgeon, Dr. William James Phillips. The population of Beaumont has never been large. In 1910 the population was 200. Today, fewer than 50 people live there.

A post office was opened in Beaumont on June 3, 1880, and remained in operation until it was discontinued on August 16, 1997.

The Beaumont St. Louis and San Francisco Railroad Water Tank in Beaumont is on the National Register of Historic Places.

Beaumont maintains a private airfield directly next to the town. The Beaumont Cafe and Hotel is a popular place to eat and stay for locals as well as pilots on their way through. There is a taxiway and parking area for small planes directly next to the restaurant itself.

The community is featured in the storyline of the 1998 film "The Long Way Home" starring Jack Lemmon. However, the actual locations filmed were in British Columbia, Canada and not in Kansas.

Geography
The climate in this area is characterized by hot, humid summers and generally mild to cool winters.  According to the Köppen Climate Classification system, Beaumont has a humid subtropical climate, abbreviated "Cfa" on climate maps.

Demographics

For statistical purposes, the United States Census Bureau has defined Beaumont as a census-designated place (CDP).

Education
The community is served by Bluestem USD 205 public school district.

See also
 National Register of Historic Places listings in Butler County, Kansas
 Beaumont St. Louis and San Francisco Railroad Water Tank
 Elk River Wind Project.

References

Further reading

External links

 Butler County maps: Current, Historic, KDOT

Unincorporated communities in Butler County, Kansas
Unincorporated communities in Kansas
Wichita, KS Metropolitan Statistical Area
Populated places established in 1880
1880 establishments in Kansas